Senator Curry may refer to:

Bill Curry (politician) (born 1951), Connecticut State Senate
Edward V. Curry (1909–1982), New York State Senate
Ulysses Currie (1935–2019), Maryland State Senate